Voltinia is a genus of metalmark butterflies (family Riodinidae). The genus was erected by Hans Ferdinand Emil Julius Stichel in 1910. Even including Eucorna, which some authors consider a distinct genus, it contains only a few species:
 †Voltinia dramba Hall, Robbins & Harvey 2004 (fossil)
 Voltinia radiata (Godman & Salvin, [1886])
 Voltinia sanarita (Schaus, 1902)
 Voltinia theata Stichel, 1910

References

Riodinidae
Butterfly genera
Taxa named by Hans Ferdinand Emil Julius Stichel